Events in the year 1949 in the Allied-occupied Germany, then in West Germany and East Germany.

Incumbents

West Germany
President –  Theodor Heuss (starting 13 September)
Chancellor –  Konrad Adenauer (starting 20 September)

East Germany
Head of State – Wilhelm Pieck (starting 11 October)
Head of Government – Otto Grotewohl (starting 12 October)

Events

 8 May - The Basic Law for the Federal Republic of Germany was approved in Bonn. 
 8 May - The Soviet War Memorial in East-Berlin is established.
 12 May - The Berlin Blockade ends.
 15/16 May - East German Constitutional Assembly election, 1949
 14 August - West German federal election, 1949
 16 September - Hamburger Morgenpost is first published.
 20 September - The First Adenauer cabinet led by Konrad Adenauer was sworn in.
 7 October - Constitution of East Germany

 Date unknown: Germany company Heckler & Koch was founded.
 Date unknown: German company Adidas was founded.
 Date unknown: The Currywurst is invented by  Herta Heuwer in Berlin.

Births 
 January 9 - Mary Roos, German singer
 January 15 - Jürgen Roters, German politician
 January 24 - Nikolaus Brender, German journalist
 February 5 - Kurt Beck, German politician
 February 13 - Jo Baier, German film director
 February 22 - Joachim Witt, German singer
 March 2 - Wolfgang Sandner, German physicist (died 2015)
 March 5 - Franz Josef Jung, German politician
 March 11 - Georg Schramm, German psychologist and Kabarett artist
 March 26 - Patrick Süskind, German writer
 April 5 - Klara Höfels, German actress and theatre director (died 2022)
 April 6 - Horst Ludwig Störmer, German physicist
 April 7 - Evelyn Haas, German judge
 April 11 - Bernd Eichinger, German film producer, director and screenwriter (died 2011)
 May 10 - Hans Reichel, German guitarist (died 2011)
 May 12 
 Raimund Hoghe, German choreographer (died 2021)
 Hans Leyendecker, German journalist
 June 8 - Hildegard Falck, German athlete
 June 12 - Jens Böhrnsen, German politician
 June 13 - Ulla Schmidt, German politician
 June 15 - Elmar Hörig, German television presenter
 June 27 - Günther Schumacher, German track cyclist
 June 28 - Peter Gruss, German biologist
 June 29 - Kurt Schrimm, German prosecutor
 July 4 - Horst Seehofer, German politician
 July 19 - Maren Kroymann, German actress and singer
 August 3 - Fritz Egner, German television host
 August 22 - Christoph, Prince of Schleswig-Holstein, German nobleman,  head of the House of Schleswig-Holstein-Sonderburg-Glücksburg 
 August 30 - Peter Maffay, German singer
 September 2 - Frank Ripploh, German actor and film director (died 2002)
 September 3 - Volker Kauder, German politician
 September 19 - Richard Rogler, German Kabarett performer and comedian
 September 22 - Ludwig Schick, German bishop of Roman Catholic Church
 October 4 - Albrecht von Boeselager, German lawyer and forester
 October 18 - Erwin Sellering, German politician
 November 8 - Gabriele Krone-Schmalz, German journalist
 November 24 - Bruno Weil, German conductor

Deaths 
 January 5 - Max Bockmühl, German chemist (born 1882)
 January 10 - Erich von Drygalski, German geographer, geophysicist and polar scientist (born 1865)
 March 4 - Joannes Baptista Sproll, German bishop of Roman Catholic Church (born 1870)
 March 12 - August Bier, German surgeon (born 1861)
 March 25 - Prince August Wilhelm of Prussia, German nobleman (born 1887)
 March 28 - Theodor Seitz, German colonial politician (born 1863)
 March 30 - Friedrich Bergius, German chemist, Nobel Prize in Chemistry laureate (born 1884)
 April 8 – Wilhelm Adam, German general (born 1877)
 May 21 — Klaus Mann, German writer (born 1906)
 May 22 - Hans Pfitzner, German composer (born 1869)
 June 23 - Heinrich Schnee, German lawyer, colonial civil servant, politician, writer, and association official (born 1871)
 July 18 - Bernhard Hoetger, German painter and sculptor (born 1874)
 September 4 - Herbert Eulenberg, German author and poet (born 1876)
 September 8 - Richard Strauss, German composer (born 1864)
 September 14 - Gottfried Graf von Bismarck-Schönhausen, German politician (born 1901)
 October 21 - Johannes Bell, German politician (born 1868)
 November 23- Gustav Radbruch, German legal scholar and politician (born 1878)
 December 23 - Arthur Eichengrün, German chemist (born 1867)
 December 30 - Leopold IV, Prince of Lippe,  sovereign of the Principality of Lippe (born 1871)

References

 
1940s in Germany
Years of the 20th century in Germany
Germany
Germany